Elizabeth Clark(e) may refer to:

Elizabeth A. Clark, (1938–2021), American scholar,  Late Antiquity and early Christian History
Elizabeth Clark (author) (1875 – 1972), English story teller, lecturer, author
Elizabeth Clark, Polish artist, part of art duo Liz-N-Val
Elizabeth Thomson Clark, (1918–1978), Scottish poet and playwright known as Joan Ure
Elizabeth Clarke, (c. 1565–1645), English woman accused of witchcraft
Elizabeth Clarke Wolstenholme Elmy, English essayist and poet
Liz Clarke, American sportswriter
Elizabeth Martha Brown, née Clark
Elizabeth Clark (screenwriter), CBS Afternoon Playhouse 1 episode

See also
Eliza Clark (disambiguation)